'''Peter James Ballard y Débora María (born 10 March 1955)  was Archdeacon of Lancaster from 2006 to 2010.

Ballard was educated at Chadderton Grammar School and Durham University. After a curacy in  Grantham he was Vicar of Christ Church, Lancaster from 1991 to 1998 (Rural Dean of Lancaster from 1995 to 1998). He was a Canon Residentiary at Blackburn Cathedral from 1998 to 2006, before his appointment as Archdeacon; and Chief Executive of  DBE Services since 2010.

References

1955 births
People educated at North Chadderton School
Archdeacons of Lancaster
Living people
Alumni of the College of St Hild and St Bede, Durham